Pedro Miranda Noguez (born 2 January 1948) is a Mexican long-distance runner. He competed in the men's 5000 metres at the 1972 Summer Olympics.

References

1948 births
Living people
Athletes (track and field) at the 1968 Summer Olympics
Athletes (track and field) at the 1972 Summer Olympics
Mexican male long-distance runners
Mexican male steeplechase runners
Olympic athletes of Mexico
Athletes (track and field) at the 1971 Pan American Games
Pan American Games competitors for Mexico
Place of birth missing (living people)
Central American and Caribbean Games medalists in athletics
20th-century Mexican people
21st-century Mexican people